Jutta Hering (later Kaffer, 18 April 1924 – 31 December 2011) was a German film editor.

Hering was born in Berlin in April 1924. She died in Munich in December 2011, at the age of 87.

Selected filmography
 The Sinful Village (1954)
 The Double Husband (1955)
 Bonjour Kathrin (1956)
 My Aunt, Your Aunt (1956)
 The Simple Girl (1957)
 Munchhausen in Africa (1958)
 La Paloma (1959)
 Old Heidelberg (1959)
 Ramona (1961)
 Axel Munthe, The Doctor of San Michele (1962)
 Room 13 (1964)
 Long Legs, Long Fingers (1966)
 Winnetou and the Crossbreed (1966)
 Winnetou and Old Firehand (1966)
 The Monk with the Whip (1967)
 The Hound of Blackwood Castle (1968)
 The Gorilla of Soho (1968)
 The Man with the Glass Eye (1969)
 Dr. Fabian: Laughing Is the Best Medicine (1969)
 Love Is Only a Word (1971)
 Everyone Dies Alone (1976)

Bibliography
 Vermilye, Jerry. Ingmar Bergman: His Life and Films. McFarland, 2006.

References

External links

1924 births
2011 deaths
Film people from Berlin
German film editors
German women film editors